Laura Riedemann (born 29 May 1998) is a German swimmer. She competed in the women's 100 metre backstroke at the 2019 World Aquatics Championships. She qualified to represent Germany at the 2020 Summer Olympics.

References

1998 births
Living people
German female swimmers
Place of birth missing (living people)
German female backstroke swimmers
Swimmers at the 2020 Summer Olympics
Olympic swimmers of Germany